Robert A. Kasting (born August 28, 1950) is a Canadian former competition swimmer who specialized in freestyle and butterfly events.  Kasting represented Canada at the 1972 Summer Olympics in Munich, Germany, where he won the bronze medal in the men's 4x100-metre medley relay, together with Canadian teammates Erik Fish, Bruce Robertson and William Mahony.

He also competed at the 1966 Commonwealth Games and won silver medals in both the 4x110-yard freestyle and the 4x220-yard freestyle. He also won two silver medals and a gold medal at the 1970 Commonwealth Games, in the 4x100-metre freestyle relay, 4x200-metre freestyle relay, and the 4x100-metre medley relay, respectively.  At the 1972 Olympic Games he finished in 10th place in both the 100-metre freestyle and the 100-metre butterfly.

Kastings was a member of the Board of Directors for Calgary Olympic Organizing Committee of the 1988 Winter Olympics.

Kasting attended Yale University in New Haven, Connecticut, where he was a member of the Yale Bulldogs swimming and diving team in National Collegiate Athletic Association (NCAA) and Ivy League competition from 1970 to 1972.  He was the Bulldogs team captain as a senior in 1972.

He was born in Ottawa, Ontario, but raised in Lethbridge, Alberta.

See also
 List of Commonwealth Games medallists in swimming (men)
 List of Olympic medalists in swimming (men)

References

External links
 Canadian Olympic Committee

1950 births
Living people
Canadian male butterfly swimmers
Canadian male freestyle swimmers
Olympic bronze medalists for Canada
Olympic bronze medalists in swimming
Olympic swimmers of Canada
Swimmers from Ottawa
Swimmers at the 1967 Pan American Games
Swimmers at the 1971 Pan American Games
Swimmers at the 1972 Summer Olympics
Swimmers at the 1966 British Empire and Commonwealth Games
Swimmers at the 1970 British Commonwealth Games
Commonwealth Games gold medallists for Canada
Commonwealth Games silver medallists for Canada
Yale Bulldogs men's swimmers
Medalists at the 1972 Summer Olympics
Pan American Games silver medalists for Canada
Pan American Games bronze medalists for Canada
Commonwealth Games medallists in swimming
Pan American Games medalists in swimming
Medalists at the 1967 Pan American Games
Medalists at the 1971 Pan American Games
20th-century Canadian people
21st-century Canadian people
Medallists at the 1966 British Empire and Commonwealth Games
Medallists at the 1970 British Commonwealth Games